Garwood Glacier is a glacier occupying the northwest part of Garwood Valley, in Victoria Land, Antarctica. It was first mapped by the British National Antarctic Expedition (1901–04), but was not named until 1911, when Thomas Griffith Taylor of the British Antarctic Expedition, 1910–13, named it for Edmund J. Garwood, professor of geology and mineralogy at the University of London.

Projection Peak rises above its head at the most southeastern point of Hobbs Ridge.

See also
 Colleen Lake
 List of glaciers in the Antarctic
 Glaciology

References

Glaciers of Scott Coast